262 (two hundred [and] sixty-two) is a natural number preceded by the number 261 and followed by 263. It has the prime factorization 2·131.

Mathematical properties 

It is the sixth meandric number, and the ninth open meandric number.

As it cannot be divided into the sum of the proper divisors of any number, it is the 17th untouchable number.

As it eventually reaches 1 when replaced by the sum of the square of each digit, it is the 40th 10-happy number.

As 262 is 262 backwards, it is a palindromic number.

References 

Integers